The .30-40 Krag (also known  as .30 U.S. and .30 Army) was a cartridge developed in the early 1890s to provide the U.S. armed forces with a smokeless powder cartridge suited for use with modern small-bore repeating rifles to be selected in the 1892 small arm trials.  Since the cartridge it was replacing was the .45-70 Government, the round was considered small-bore at the time. The design selected was ultimately the Krag–Jørgensen, formally adopted as the M1892 Springfield. It was also used in M1893 and later Gatling guns.

History and development 
Though the U.S. Navy and Marine Corps had adopted limited numbers of smokeless powder and bolt-action rifles, the .30-40 was the first cartridge adopted by the US Army that was designed from the outset for smokeless powder. It was patterned after .303 British, to which it is very similar geometrically.

The first use of a smokeless powder round by Winchester was a single shot in 30–40, and it was one of only three rounds for which the 1895 Winchester lever action, introduced in 1896, was originally chambered.

From the outset, the .30-40 cartridge proved popular for hunting and was chambered in a variety of firearms. In 1899, a Krag in .30-40 caliber was used to shoot the world-record Rocky Mountain elk. The record stood until the latter half of the 20th century.

In October 1899, after reviewing the experiences of the Spanish–American War, U.S. Army ordnance authorities developed a new loading for the .30 Army used in the Krag rifle, in an attempt to match the ballistics of the 7×57mm Mauser cartridge employed by Spanish forces in that conflict. However, once the new loading was issued, reports of cracked locking lugs on service Krags began to surface. In March 1900 the remaining stocks of this ammunition (some 3.5 million rounds) were returned to the arsenals, broken down, and reloaded back to the original  specification.

In 1903, after recommendations from the infantry Small Arms Board, the U.S. Army formally adopted a higher-velocity .30-caliber replacement for the .30-40 or .30 Army cartridge. The new cartridge was designated by its year of adoption, the .30-03.

Rifles, handguns, and other weapons chambered in .30-40 Krag 
Krag–Jørgensen
Winchester High-Wall
M1885 Remington-Lee (Remington-Lee bolt-action)
Remington Rolling Block
Gatling gun, M1893 and later
Winchester Model 1895
Ruger No. 1
Ruger No. 3
Thompson-Center Encore

See also 
List of rifle cartridges
Table of handgun and rifle cartridges
.30-03 (.30-45)
.30-06 Springfield
7 mm caliber other cartridges of similar size.

References 

 Barnes, Frank C; Skinner, Stan (Ed.) (1965, 1969, 1972, 1980, 1985, 1989, 1993, 1997, 2000, 2003). Cartridges of the World (10th ed.). Iola, Wisconsin: Krause Publications.  .
 .30-40 Krag by Chuck Hawks
 Hornady Handbook of Cartridge Reloading vol I, Sixth Edition; Book by Hornady Mfg Co, 2003
 
 Cartridge Dimensions at Steve's Pages

Pistol and rifle cartridges
Military cartridges
Rimmed cartridges